OpernTurm (Opera Tower) is a 43-storey  skyscraper in the Westend-Süd district of Frankfurt, Germany. The property is situated opposite Alte Oper on the corner of Bockenheimer Landstraße and Bockenheimer Anlage. The building was designed by Christoph Mäckler. The project developer was Tishman Speyer, a US firm that previously built the Sony Center in Berlin and the Messeturm in Frankfurt.

Design 
The Opernturm consists of a 42-storey,  tower, a 7-storey,  podium building facing towards Alte Oper. The yellow-beige stone cladding of the facades was designed to fit in with the existing buildings surrounding Opernplatz. Designed to consume 23 percent less energy than stipulated by Germany's 2007 EnEV Energy Regulation, the Opernturm was one of the first office buildings in Europe to be certified to the Leadership in Energy and Environmental Design (LEED) Gold standard.

The site was occupied by one of Frankfurt's first high-rise buildings, the  Zürich-Haus built in 1962. In 1998 the owner of the building, Zürich Versicherung, commissioned Christoph Mäckler's firm to design a new building that would be  taller in order to maximize land use. The local government eventually agreed but Zürich Versicherung did not go ahead with the development and sold empty site - the old tower was demolished in 2002 - to project developer Tishman Speyer in July 2004.

Civil engineering works started in late 2006 with the removal of the former underground garage of Zürich-Haus. The groundbreaking for the development of OpernTurm took place on 22 January 2007.

The completion of Opernturm in late 2009 added another landmark to the city's much photographed skyline, with its elegant silhouette and the natural stone façade setting it apart from the glass towers dominating the cityscape.

Tenants 
In November 2009, the retailer Manufactum was the first tenant to move into the podium building. The building's anchor tenant, occupying , is the European headquarters offices of the UBS Group AG.

Leading multinational legal services Allen & Overy, Ashurst, Morgan, Lewis & Bockius and Reed Smith LLP and the world's largest asset manager BlackRock are occupying several floors of the tower.

Skyscrapers in Frankfurt

See also
 List of tallest buildings in Frankfurt
 List of tallest buildings in Germany
 List of tallest buildings in the European Union
 List of tallest buildings in Europe

References

External links 

Tishman Speyer – OpernTurm 
OpernTurm - official Website

Office buildings completed in 2009
Skyscrapers in Frankfurt
Bankenviertel
Skyscraper office buildings in Germany